This is a list of all cricketers who have played first-class, list A or Twenty20 cricket for Punjab cricket team. Seasons given are first and last seasons; the player did not necessarily play in all the intervening seasons. Players in bold have played international cricket.

Last updated at the end of the 2015/16 season.

A
 Love Ablish, 2004/05-2011/12
 Monish Agarwal, 1989/90
 Sanjeev Agarwal, 1986/87-1987/88
 Amanpreet Singh, 2006/07-2008/09
 Mohinder Amarnath, 1969/70-1973/74
 Rajinder Amarnath, 1976/77
 Surinder Amarnath, 1968/69-1973/74
 Amitoze Singh, 2010/11-2014/15
 Amrinder Singh, 2000/01
 Anmolpreet Singh, 2014/15
 Devender Arora, 1981/82
 Monish Arora, 1990/91-1995/96
 Rajiv Arora, 1980/81
 Arshdeep Singh, 2022-

B
 Balbir Singh, 1968/69-1977/78
 Balkar Singh, 1982/83-1986/87
 Baltej Singh, 2011/12-2015/16
 Balwant Singh, 1972/73
 Deepak Bansal, 2014/15-2015/16
 Harmeet Singh Bansal, 2008/09-2015/16
 Arun Bedi, 1990/91-1996/97
 Emmanuel Benjamin, 1973/74-1977/78
 Vishwas Bhalla, 2008/09-2010/11
 Manish Bhatia, 2011/12
 Moti Lal Behal, 1970/71
 Bhupinder Singh, 1987/88-1999/00
 Bhupinder Singh, 1989/90-1997/98
 Bharat Bhushan, 1996/97-2000/01
 Binwant Singh, 2004/05
 Birinder Singh, 2007/08

C
 Ravinder Chadha, 1968/69-1969/70
 KS Chamanlal, 1974/75
 Malhotra Chamanlal, 1968/69-1970/71
 Charanjeet Singh, 2007/08-2008/09
 Charanjit Singh, 1973/74
 Vedraj Chauhan, 1974/75-1978/79
 Himanshu Chawla, 2009/10-2015/16
 Ashok Chopra, 1970/71
 Deepak Chopra, 1972/73-1988/89
 Sapan Chopra, 1986/87-1992/93
 Vinay Choudhary, 2011/12-2014/15

D
 Gundeep Deol, 1995/96-1996/97
 Meghraj Dhannu, 1968/69
 Pankaj Dharmani, 1992/93-2010/11
 Rajinder Dhawan, 1976/77-1977/78
 Sanjay Dhull, 2001/02
 Dilraj Singh, 1990/91
 Yogesh Dutta, 1977/78-1985/86

G
 Gagandeep Singh, 1999/00-2009/10
 Gaurav Gambhir, 2008/09-2009/10
 Baldev Gandhi, 1969/70-1972/73
 Rajinder Ghai, 1979/80-1988/89
 Shubek Gill, 2014/15
 Karan Goel, 2005/06-2012/13
 Manpreet Gony, 2007/08-2014/15
 Gaurav Gupta, 2003/04-2006/07
 Kamal Gupta, 1969/70-1970/71
 Gurender Singh, 2010/11-2015/16
 Gurinder Singh, 1985/86
 Gurkeerat Singh, 2011/12-2015/16
 Gurkirat Singh, 2008/09-2012/13
 Gurpreet Singh, 1987/88
 Gursharan Singh, 1986/87-1994/95

H
 Rakesh Handa, 1978/79-1982/83
 Harbhajan Singh, 1997/98-2015/16
 Harjinder Singh, 1984/85-1986/87
 Harminder Singh, 1968/69-1970/71
 Harminder Singh, 1998/99-2002/03
 Harpreet Singh, 1993/94
 Harman Harry, 1998/99
 Harvinder Singh, 1995/96-1998/99

J
 Jaideep Singh, 1991/92-1993/94
 Jasbir Singh, 1968/69-1976/77
 Jaskaran Singh, 2008/09-2015/16
 Jaskaranvir Singh, 2014/15
 Jaspal Singh, 1988/89-1991/92
 Jiwanjot Singh, 2012/13-2015/16
 Joginder Singh, 1972/73-1974/75
 Narinder Joshi, 1970/71
 Ankur Jund, 2007/08-2009/10

K
 Karan Kaila, 2015/16
 Ankur Kakkar, 1999/00-2009/10
 Amit Kakria, 2003/04
 Harminder Kaku, 1997/98
 Hari Kali, 2001/02
 Prem Kalia, 1969/70
 Sumit Kalia, 2006/07
 Rajdeep Kalsi, 1985/86-1994/95
 Obaid Kamal, 1993/94-1995/96
 Neeraj Kamal, 1980/81
 Sarul Kanwar, 2010/11-2011/12
 Ashwini Kapoor, 1987/88-1990/91
 Aashish Kapoor, 1993/94-1997/98
 Chander Kapoor, 1969/70
 Lalit Kapoor, 1998/99
 Sanjeev Kapuria, 1997/98
 Siddarth Kaul, 2007/08-2015/16
 Uday Kaul, 2005/06-2015/16
 Ashok Kaushal, 1968/69-1970/71
 Amarjeet Kaypee, 1980/81-1985/86
 Aijaz Khan, 1971/72-1974/75
 Sunil Khanna, 1978/79-1981/82
 Upinder Khanna, 1972/73-1974/75
 Varun Khanna, 2008/09-2015/16
 Gitansh Khera, 2010/11-2015/16
 Surinder Kohli, 1970/71
 Taruwar Kohli, 2008/09-2014/15
 Kulwant Singh, 1985/86
 Babloo Kumar, 2000/01-2001/02
 Rajinder Kumar, 1971/72-1972/73
 Sanjay Kumar, 1998/99-1999/00
 Satish Kumar, 1978/79-1985/86
 Umesh Kumar, 1969/70-1985/86

L
 Sarabjit Ladda, 2007/08-2015/16
 Lakhbir Singh, 1997/98-1999/00
 Akash Lal, 1969/70-1975/76
 Bhandari Lal, 1978/79-1982/83
 Chaman Lal, 1995/96-1996/97
 Girdhari Lal, 1977/78-1983/84
 Madan Lal, 1968/69-1971/72
 Madan Lal, 1985/86
 Bharat Lumba, 2007/08-2010/11
 Sharad Lumba, 2013/14
 Suresh Luthra, 1980/81

M
 Chandan Madan, 2002/03-2012/13
 Sanjay Mahajan, 1996/97-2003/04
 Vivek Mahajan, 1999/00-2001/02
 Mahesh Inder Singh, 1977/78-1991/92
 Anmol Malhotra, 2015/16
 Ishan Malhotra, 2001/02-2011/12
 Mandeep Singh, 1994/95-1995/96
 Mandeep Singh, 2009/10-2015/16
 Jeet Maninder Singh, 2014/15-2015/16
 Manmohan Singh, 1971/72-1972/73
 Ramesh Manna, 1970/71
 Jagroop Marlin, 1968/69-1974/75
 Ajay Mehra, 1989/90-1997/98
 Manav Mehra, 1993/94-1997/98
 Samir Mehra, 1988/89-1992/93
 Vijay Mehra, 1970/71-1974/75
 Ashwini Minna, 1975/76-1979/80
 Sanjay Mishra, 1978/79
 Krishnan Mohan, 1987/88-1995/96
 Dinesh Mongia, 1995/96-2006/07

N
 Navdeep Singh, 1997/98-2010/11

P
 Dhruv Pandove, 1987/88-1991/92
 M. P. Pandove, 1968/69-1977/78
 Parampal Singh, 1985/86-1986/87
 Amit Parashar, 2010/11
 Pargat Singh, 2015/16
 Harish Puri, 2001/02
 Raj Puri, 1986/87-1987/88
 Prabhjot Sidhu, 2021-2022 (Now Plays)

R
 Dharam Raj, 1977/78
 Tilak Raj, 1972/73-1974/75
 Rajinder Pal, 1968/69-1969/70
 Rajinder Pal Singh, 1999/00
 Rajwinder Singh, 2008/09-2015/16
 Ralia Ram, 1970/71
 Ranbir Singh, 1980/81
 Rakesh Rathore, 1981/82-1985/86
 Vikram Rathour, 1988/89-2001/02
 Ravinder Rana, 1979/80
 Ravi Inder Singh, 2007/08-2014/15
 Ashwini Razdan, 1971/72-1979/80
 Ravneet Ricky, 1997/98-2008/09

S
 Sunil Saggi, 1986/87-1987/88
 Narinder Saini, 1968/69
 Rakesh Saini, 1995/96-1999/00
 Harmeet Saini, 1994/95-1995/96
 Hardavinder Sandhu, 2005/06
 Kailash Sanwal, 1998/99-2001/02
 Sandeep Sanwal, 1998/99-2005/06
 Gaganinder Singh, 1998/99-1999/00
 Sarabjit Singh, 1968/69
 Sarabjit Singh, 2005/06-2006/07
 Sarabjit Singh Maan, 1996/97
 Sarandeep Singh, 1998/99-2000/01
 Sarjinder Pal Singh, 2002/03-2004/05
 Amit Sharma, 1992/93-1999/00
 Arun Sharma, 1978/79-1993/94
 Bipul Sharma, 2003/04-2012/13
 Manish Sharma, 2000/01-2006/07
 Rahul Sharma, 2006/07-2013/14
 Rajesh Sharma, 2002/03-2006/07
 Rakesh Sharma, 1980/81
 Ranjeev Sharma, 1993/94-1994/95
 Samrat Sharma, 2002/03-2003/04
 Sandeep Sharma, 2011/12-2014/15
 Sandeep Sharma, 1994/95-2000/01
 Sudhir Sharma, 1994/95-1995/96
 Suresh Sharma, 1976/77-1980/81
 Vineet Sharma, 1999/00-2005/06
 Vineet Sharma, 1997/98-1999/00
 Vinod Sharma, 1968/69-1978/79
 Yashpal Sharma, 1973/74-1986/87
 Parshottam Shukla, 1975/76-1976/77
 Mayank Sidhana, 2007/08-2015/16
 Navdeep Sidhu, 2010/11-2014/15
 Navjot Singh Sidhu, 1981/82-1999/00
 V. R. V. Singh, 2003/04-2013/14
 Ram Singla, 1972/73-1975/76
 Ankur Sodhi, 2001/02
 Reetinder Singh Sodhi, 1996/97-2010/11
 Sunny Sohal, 2005/06-2013/14
 Barinder Sran, 2011/12-2015/16
 Surindernath, 1968/69-1972/73

T
 Sarkar Talwar, 1969/70
 Swamy Talwar, 1968/69-1971/72
 Tejinder Pal Singh, 1998/99
 Sukhvinder Tinku, 1988/89
 Arun Tuli, 1996/97

U
 Amit Uniyal, 2001/02-2010/11

V
 Bharati Vij, 1987/88-1997/98
 Manan Vohra, 2011/12-2015/16

Y
 Yograj Singh, 1977/78-1984/85
 Yuvraj Singh, 1996/97-2015/16

References

Punjab cricketers

Lists of people from Punjab, India